This is a list of franchise records for the Boston Bruins of the National Hockey League.

Team records

Single season

Single game

Streaks

Career regular season records

Skaters

Goaltenders
 Minimum 100 games

 Minimum 100 games

Single season records

Skaters

Goaltenders
 Minimum 40 games

 Minimum 30 games

Career playoffs records

Skaters

Goaltenders
 Minimum 10 games

 Minimum 7 games

Notes

†: Beginning in the 2005–06 season, ties are no longer possible. At the same time, the league began tracking overtime losses for goaltenders.

Active Bruins players are in Bold.

References

Records
National Hockey League statistical records
Records